William Templeton may refer to:

William Templeton (mayor) (1853–1898), sixth mayor of Vancouver, British Columbia, Canada
William Templeton (screenwriter) (1913–1973), Scottish screenwriter and playwright
William Paterson Templeton (1876–1938), Scottish Unionist Party politician
Bill Templeton (1927–2005), Australian politician